Aleksandar Zečević (born June 29, 1975) is a Serbian professional basketball coach and former player.

Playing career 
Zečević played for the Crvena zvezda and Hemofarm of the Yugoslav League. In the 1993–94 season, he won the Yugoslav League with Zvezda and played together with Dragoljub Vidačić, Ivica Mavrenski, Saša Obradović, Mileta Lisica, Aleksandar Trifunović, and Dejan Tomašević. In the 2000–01 Hemofarm season, he played Korać Cup Finals where he lost from Spanish team Unicaja. Over sixteen games in that Korać Cup season, he averaged 16.3 points, 5.3 rebounds and 1.1 assists per game.

In 2001, he went abroad. During next ten years he played in Germany (Telekom Baskets Bonn), Portugal (U.D. Oliveirense), Belgium (RBC Verviers-Pepinster and Leuven Bears), France (Olympique Antibes), and Georgia (Dinamo Tbilisi).

Prior to 2003–04 season, Zečević signed for the RBC Verviers-Pepinster of the Belgium Division I. In 2003–04 ULEB Cup season he averaged 11.7 points, 2.3 rebounds and 1.2 assists per game over ten games. In 2004–05 FIBA Europe League season he averaged 20.0 points, 3.8 rebounds and 3.2 assists per game over thirteen games.

Coaching career 
In November 2016, Zečević became a head coach for the RBC Pepinster. He left Pepinster after the end of the 2016–17 season.

Career achievements 
 Yugoslav League champion: 1 (with Crvena zvezda: 1993–94)
 Portuguese Cup winner: 1 (with U.D. Oliveirense: 2002–03)
 Portuguese League Cup winner: 1 (with U.D. Oliveirense: 2002–03)
 Yugoslav Super Cup winner: 1 (with Crvena zvezda: 1993)

References

External links
 Player Profile at eurobasket.com
 Player Profile at fibaeurope.com

1975 births
Living people
Bosnia and Herzegovina expatriate basketball people in Serbia
KK Crvena zvezda players
KK Hemofarm players
Leuven Bears players
RBC Verviers-Pepinster coaches
Small forwards
Serbian men's basketball coaches
Serbian men's basketball players
Serbian expatriate basketball people in Belgium
Serbian expatriate basketball people in France
Serbian expatriate basketball people in Georgia (country)
Serbian expatriate basketball people in Germany
Serbian expatriate basketball people in Portugal
Serbs of Bosnia and Herzegovina
Basketball players from Sarajevo
Telekom Baskets Bonn players
RBC Pepinster players
Yugoslav men's basketball players